The Skory class were the first destroyers built for the Soviet Navy after World War II. Seventy (70) ships were built between 1949 and 1953. The Soviet designation was Project 30bis.

Design

The ships were derived from the Project 30 , but were slightly larger with better sea-keeping and significantly increased endurance. These ships were longitudinally framed and completely welded. The ships were built in 101 modular pre-fabricated sections which led to rapid building times. The machinery and main armament was essentially identical to those of the Ognevoy-class destroyers but the boilers employed forced draught for increased power.

Modernisation

The ships were modernised in the 1950s with new anti-aircraft guns and anti-submarine mortars and updated sensors (new radar and sonar). One bank of torpedo tubes were removed and extra accommodation (deckhouses) added.

Ships
70 ships were built for both the Soviet navy and for export, this is the largest production run for any large Soviet surface warship.
 
Soviet ships:
Baltic Fleet – 16 ships, built by Zhdanov yard Leningrad, all names began with letter S
 Smely (Courageous)
 Stoyky (Persistent)
 Skory (Speedy) →transferred to Poland as 
 Surovy (Harsh)
 Serdity (Severe)
 Sposobny (Capable)
 Stremitelny (Impetuous)
 Sokrushitelny (Wrecking)
 Svobodny (Free)
 Statny (Handsome or Well-Proportioned)
 Smetlivy (Resourceful) → transferred to Poland as 
 Smotryashchy (Looking)
 Sovershenny (Perfect)
 Seriozny (Serious)
 Solidny (Solid)
 Stepenny (Sedate)
 Pylky (Ardent) →transferred to Indonesia as KRI Diponegoro
Black Sea Fleet – 18 ships, built by Nikolaev yards, Names began with letter B
 Bditelny (Watchful)
 Bezuderzhny (Irrestrainable)
 Buyny (Rambunctious)
 Bezuprechny (Irreproachable)
 Besstrashny (Fearless)
 Boyevoy (Militant) →transferred to Indonesia as KRI Sarwadjala
 Bystry (Rapid)
 Burny (Turbulent) →transferred to Egypt as Suez
 Besposhchadny (Merciless)
 Bezzhalostny (Ruthless) →transferred to Indonesia as KRI Brawidjaja
 Bezzavetny (Whole-hearted) →transferred to Indonesia as KRI Sultan Iskandar Muda
 Besshumny (Noiseless)
 Bespokoyny (Restless) →transferred to Indonesia as KRI Sandjaja
 Bezboyaznenny (Dauntless)
 Bezotkazny (Troubleproof)
 Bessmenny (Unchanging) →transferred to Egypt as Damiet
 Bezukoriznenny (Immaculate)
Northern Fleet – 18 ships built by Severodvinsk yard, Names began with letter O
 Ognenny (Fiery)
 Otchetlivy (Clear)
 Ostry (Sharp)
 Otvetstvenny (Responsible)
 Otmenny (Alpha Plus)
 Otryvisty (Jerky)
 Otrazhayushchy (Reflecting)
 Otradny (Cuddly)
 Ozarenny (Afflative)
 Oberegayushchy (Which Protects)
 Ostorozhny (Careful)
 Okrylenny (Winged)
 Otchayanny (Foolhardy) →transferred to Egypt as El Nasser
 Opasny (Dangerous)
 Otzyvchivy (Responsive)
 Ozhivlenny (Lively)
 Ozhestochenny (Embittered)
 Okhranyayushchy (Safeguarding)
Pacific Fleet – 17 ships, built by Komsomolsk-on-Amur yard, names began with V
 Vstrechny (Counter)
 Vedushchy (Leading)
 Vazhny (Сonsiderable)
 Vspylchivy (Spitfire)
 Velichavy (Stately, Majestic)
 Vertky (Nimble)
 Vechny (Permamnent)
 Vikhrevoy (Vortex)
 Vidny (Prominent)
 Verny  (Faithful)
 Vnimatelny (Intent)
 Vnezapny (Unexpected) →transferred to Indonesia as KRI Sawunggaling
 Vyrazitelny (Expressive) →transferred to Indonesia as KRI Singamangaradja
 Volevoy (Volitional) →transferred to Indonesia as KRI Siliwangi
 Volny (Free)
 Vkradchivy (Insinuating) 
 Vdumchivy (Thoughtful)
 Vrazumitelny (Intelligible)

Exported ships were:

 Egyptian Navy – 3 ships acquired between 1954 and 1958, one sunk in 1967, rest retired in 1985–86.
 Indonesian Navy – 8 ships transferred from Baltic, Black Sea and Pacific Fleets
 Polish Navy – 2 ships transferred from Baltic Fleet

The Soviet ships were decommissioned and scrapped between 1965 and 1984.

See also
List of ships of the Soviet Navy
List of ships of Russia by project number

References
  Also published as

External links

Page in Russian Language
  All Russian Skoryy Class Destroyers – Complete Ship List

Destroyer classes